Niranjan Das (born 1931) is an Indian wrestler. He competed in the men's freestyle flyweight at the 1952 Summer Olympics.

References

External links
 

1931 births
2010s deaths
Indian male sport wrestlers
Olympic wrestlers of India
Wrestlers at the 1952 Summer Olympics
Place of birth missing (living people)